Hugh William Reilley (29 May 1918 – 17 October 1940) was a Canadian fighter pilot who flew for the RAF during the Battle of Britain.

Early life
Born in London, Ontario, Canada. Reilley was educated at London South Collegiate from 1933 to 1938.

Second World War
In May 1939 Reilley joined the Royal Air Force. He flew with No. 64 Squadron and No. 66 Squadron in Spitfires during the Battle of Britain. He was shot down in his Spitfire I (R6800) on 17 October 1940 by a Bf 109 of JG 51 flown by Oberstleutnant  Werner Mölders over Westerham Kent at 15:25hrs. His Spitfire crashed and burned out at Crockham Hill, Sevenoaks.

Reilley was 22 years old. He is buried in Gravesend Cemetery, Kent.

See also

List of Battle of Britain pilots
Non-British personnel in the RAF during the Battle of Britain

External links
Hugh Reilley
Pilot Officer Hugh W. Reilley
Ra-pilots

References

1918 births
1940 deaths
Canadian World War II pilots
Royal Air Force Volunteer Reserve personnel of World War II
Royal Air Force personnel killed in World War II
The Few
People from London, Ontario
Royal Air Force officers
Royal Air Force pilots of World War II
British World War II fighter pilots
Canadian military personnel from Ontario